Franciscus ("Frans") Albertus Antonius Johannes Maassen (born 27 January 1965 in Haelen, Limburg) is a directeur sportif. He was a professional road racing cyclist between 1987 and 1995. He completed seven Tour de France stage races, including the 1990 Tour de France where he was involved in the Stage 1 breakaway that caused the rest of the race to be the most surprising Tour in over a decade. He was the only one of the four breakaway riders not to wear the maillot jaune, but he won the stage. He twice won the Tour of Belgium, and won the 1994 Tour de Luxembourg.

Since 2005, Maassen has been the assistant directeur sportif of the Rabobank, a Netherlands-based UCI ProTour team.

Major results

1986
 2nd Overall Tour of Sweden
1987
 1st Stage 2 Danmark Rundt
 2nd GP du Canton d'Argovie
 7th Brussels–Ingooigem
 8th Tour Méditerranéen
1988
 1st  Overall Tour of Belgium
1st Stages 3a & 3b (ITT)
 1st Prologue Étoile de Bessèges
 1st Stage 2 Volta a la Comunitat Valenciana
 1st Stage 4a Tour de Romandie
 1st Stage 6a Critérium du Dauphiné Libéré
 3rd Overall Three Days of De Panne
 6th Overall Tour of Sweden
1989
 1st  Road race, National Road Championships
 1st Wincanton Classic
 2nd Overall Tour of Belgium
1st Stage 3b (ITT)
 2nd Milan–San Remo
 3rd Overall Étoile de Bessèges
 4th UCI Road World Cup
 4th De Brabantse Pijl
1990
 1st  Overall Tour of Belgium
1st Prologue & Stage 5a (ITT)
 1st  Overall Étoile de Bessèges
1st Stage 6 (ITT)
 1st De Brabantse Pijl
 1st Grand Prix Eddy Merckx
 1st Grand Prix de Fourmies
 1st Stage 1 Tour de France
 2nd Overall Tour of Sweden
1st Stages 2 & 3
 3rd Druivenkoers Overijse
 4th Gent–Wevelgem
 6th Overall Nissan Classic
 7th Overall Tirreno–Adriatico
 9th Rund um den Henninger Turm
1991
 1st  Overall Ronde van Nederland
1st Stage 2b (ITT)
 1st Amstel Gold Race
 1st Stage 5b Volta a la Comunitat Valenciana
 2nd Overall Three Days of De Panne
 2nd Overall Tour de Luxembourg
 2nd Grand Prix Eddy Merckx
 3rd Overall Étoile de Bessèges
 3rd Grand Prix Pino Cerami
 4th Overall Four Days of Dunkirk
1st Stage 5
 5th Tour of Flanders
 5th Circuit des Frontières
 6th UCI Road World Cup
 6th Grand Prix des Nations
 10th Wincanton Classic
1992
 1st  Overall Three Days of De Panne
 Tour de Luxembourg
1st Stages 2 & 3b (ITT)
 1st Stage 3 Grand Prix du Midi Libre
 2nd Overall Four Days of Dunkirk
1st Stage 4 (ITT)
 2nd Paris–Brussels
 2nd Grand Prix Eddy Merckx
 2nd Grand Prix Pino Cerami
 3rd Rund um den Henninger Turm
 5th Tour of Flanders
 5th GP Ouest–France
 8th Paris–Tours
1993
 1st Grote Prijs Jef Scherens
 1st Stage 4 Grand Prix du Midi Libre
 1st Stage 6 Vuelta a Andalucía
 2nd Overall Three Days of De Panne
 2nd Tour of Flanders
 2nd Circuit des Frontières
 3rd Road race, National Road Championships
 5th De Brabantse Pijl
 6th Overall Tour de Luxembourg
 7th Rund um den Henninger Turm
 10th Road race, UCI Road World Championships
1994
 1st  Overall Tour de Luxembourg
1st Stage 3b (ITT)
 3rd Overall Three Days of De Panne
1st Stage 3b (ITT)
 3rd Veenendaal–Veenendaal Classic
1995
 1st Profronde van Heerlen
 2nd Time trial, National Road Championships
 2nd Rund um Köln
 6th Overall Ronde van Nederland

References

External links

1965 births
Living people
Dutch male cyclists
Dutch Tour de France stage winners
People from Leudal
UCI Road World Championships cyclists for the Netherlands
Cyclists from Limburg (Netherlands)
Directeur sportifs